Dan Johnson Haley (September 15, 1940 – October 19, 2013) was an American football player and coach. Haley played college football at the University of Kentucky under coach Blanton Collier. He served as the head football coach at Cumberland College—now known as the University of the Cumberlands—in Williamsburg, Kentucky from 1996 to 2000. He later served as an assistant at Western Kentucky University under Jack Harbaugh.

Head coaching record

College

References

1940 births
2013 deaths
Cumberlands Patriots football coaches
Kentucky Wildcats football players
Western Kentucky Hilltoppers football coaches
High school football coaches in Kentucky
People from Bell County, Kentucky
Players of American football from Kentucky